Dysomma goslinei is an eel in the family Synaphobranchidae (cutthroat eels). It was described by Catherine H. Robins and Charles Richard Robins in 1976. It is a tropical, marine eel which is known from the Indo-Pacific. Males can reach a maximum total length of 19.7 centimetres.

Named in honor of the authors’ colleague, ichthyologist William A. Gosline (1915-2002) of the University of Michigan.

References

Synaphobranchidae
Taxa named by Charles Richard Robins
Taxa named by Catherine H. Robins
Fish described in 1976